The men's 200 metres was an event at the 1956 Summer Olympics in Melbourne. There were 67 competitors from 32 countries. The first and second rounds were held on Monday 26 November and the semifinals and final on Tuesday 27 November. The maximum number of athletes per nation had been set at 3 since the 1930 Olympic Congress.

Even though it had been a part of the Olympics, the IAAF had only certified world records for the 200 meters around the bend since 1951. Both claimants to the record Andy Stanfield and Thane Baker were in this final. Stanfield took a slight lead from the gun, making up the stagger on Jose Telles da Conceicao to his outside just past halfway through the turn. Inside of him, 100 meter champion Bobby Morrow slowly accelerated and caught Stanfield. Coming off the turn, Morrow had almost a meter advantage. Two meters back, Baker was in a battle with Michael Agostini. Down the final straight, Morrow opened up another meter to take the win. Baker separated from Agostini and made a late run at Stanfield, coming up a couple of feet short. 

Morrow's hand time of 20.6 second equalled the world record. The American sweep was the second consecutive and fourth overall sweep for the United States; Morrow's gold was the fifth consecutive and 10th overall for the nation. Stanfield and Baker were the third and fourth men to earn multiple medals in the 200 metres.

Background

This was the 12th appearance of the event, which was not held at the first Olympics in 1896 but has been on the program ever since. Two of the six finalists from the 1952 Games returned: gold medalist Andy Stanfield and silver medalist Thane Baker, both of the United States. The third member of the 1952 American sweep, James Gathers, had been replaced by Bobby Morrow. Morrow and Dave Sime had been favorites early in the year, but Sime was injured and did not make the Olympic team.

The Bahamas, Ethiopia, Guyana, Liberia, Malaya, Puerto Rico, Singapore, and Uganda each made their debut in the event; East and West Germany competed as the United Team of Germany for the first time. The United States made its 12th appearance, the only nation to have competed at each edition of the 200 metres to date.

Competition format

The competition used the four round format introduced in 1920: heats, quarterfinals, semifinals, and a final. There were 12 heats of between 2 and 7 runners each, with the top 2 men in each advancing to the quarterfinals. The quarterfinals consisted of 4 heats of 6 athletes each; the 3 fastest men in each heat advanced to the semifinals. There were 2 semifinals, each with 6 runners. In that round, the top 3 athletes advanced. The final had 6 runners. The races were run on a 400 metre track.

Records

Prior to the competition, the existing world (curved track) and Olympic records were as follows.

Bobby Morrow's hand-timed final run of 20.6 seconds was equal to the world record and set a new Olympic record.

Schedule

All times are Australian Eastern Standard Time (UTC+10)

Results

Heats

Twelve heats were held, the two fastest in each would qualify for the quarterfinals.

Heat 1

Heat 2

Heat 3

Heat 4

Heat 5

Heat 6

Heat 7

Heat 8

Heat 9

Heat 10

Heat 11

Heat 12

Quarterfinals

Four heats were held, the three fastest in each would qualify for the semifinals.

Quarterfinal 1

Quarterfinal 2

Quarterfinal 3

Quarterfinal 4

Semifinals

Two semifinals were held, the three fastest of which would qualify for the final.

Semifinal 1

Semifinal 2

Final

References

External links
 Official Report
 Results

M
200 metres at the Olympics
Men's events at the 1956 Summer Olympics